New Haven-Riverdale is a former rural municipality in the Canadian province of Prince Edward Island within Queens County.

History 
The Municipality of New Haven-Riverdale was originally incorporated in 1974. It incorporated as a rural municipality on January 1, 2018. On September 1, 2020, the Rural Municipality of New Haven-Riverdale amalgamated with the rural municipalities of Afton, Bonshaw, Meadowbank, and West River. The amalgamated municipality was named the Rural Municipality of West River.

Geography 
Localities within Bonshaw include Churchill, New Haven, Riverdale, and Strathgartney.

See also 
List of communities in Prince Edward Island

References 

Communities in Queens County, Prince Edward Island
Former rural municipalities in Prince Edward Island